The following highways are numbered 877:

United States